Pigüeña is one of fifteen parishes (administrative divisions) in Somiedo, a municipality within the province and autonomous community of Asturias, in northern Spain.  

The postal code is 33842.

Villages
 Pigüeña
 Rebollada (La Rebullada)
 Robledo (Rubléu)

References

Parishes in Somiedo